The 1999 NAIA Football Championship Series concluded on December 18, 1999, with the championship game played at Jim Carroll Stadium in Savannah, Tennessee.  The game was won by the Northwestern Oklahoma State Rangers over the Georgetown Tigers by a score of 34–26.

Tournament bracket

  * denotes OT.

References

 
NAIA Football National Championship
Northwestern Oklahoma State Rangers football
Georgetown Tigers football
NAIA Football National Championship
NAIA Football National Championship
NAIA football